Le Diamant (or) is a town and commune in the French overseas department of Martinique.

Geography
The town of Le Diamant is situated in southwestern Martinique, where the Diamond Rock is.

Population

See also
Communes of Martinique

References

External links

Official website 

Communes of Martinique
Populated places in Martinique